Kotli Lions is a Pakistani professional T20 franchise that takes part in the  Kashmir Premier League. The team is captained by Khurram Manzoor and coached by Mushtaq Ahmed. The franchise represents the city of Kotli, the capital of the Kotli District.

History

2021 season

In the 2021 KPL, Kotli Lions won 1 match, lost 3 and had one match end in no result in the group stage. They finished last in the group and were eliminated from the competition.

2022 season

In May 2022, former Pakistani captain, Sarfaraz Ahmed, announced that he would represent Kotli Lions in the 2022 KPL. Khurram Manzoor was announced as the team’s icon player and captain. During the 2022 KPL, the KPL terminated Kotli Lions’ management after they weren’t able to pay outstanding payments. Kotli Lions’ head coach Saeed Azad left the team and was replaced by Mushtaq Ahmed. The KPL management temporarily took over Kotli Lions.

Team identity

Current squad

Captains

Coaches

Result summary

Overall result in KPL

Head-to-head record

Source: , Last updated: 31 January 2022

Statistics

Most runs 

Source: , Last updated: 23 August 2022

Most wickets 

Source: , Last Updated: 23 August 2022

References

External links

Kashmir Premier League (Pakistan)
Cricket teams in Pakistan